Halmi may refer to:
 
Artúr Lajos Halmi (1866–1939), Hungarian painter
Robert Halmi (1924–2014), Hungarian-American film and television producer
Halmi, the Hungarian name for Halmeu Commune, Bihor County, Romania